Giuliano Pesello, born Giuliano d'Arrigo (sometimes spelled Arrigho) (ca. 1367 - 1446), was an Italian painter of the early Renaissance period, active mainly in Florence. He was a pupil of the painter Andrea del Castagno.  Vasari states he painted drawings of animals with skill. He is often called Il Pesello.

His son in law Stefano di Francesco, also a painter, died in 1427, leaving a very young son, Francesco Pesellino, whom Pesello brought up and trained. Pesellino appears to have inherited his grandfather's studio, and became a celebrated painter in his own right.

Gallery

References

Getty Union Artists Name List
National Gallery Catalogues (new series): The Fifteenth Century Italian Paintings, Volume 1, by Dillian Gordon, 2003,

External links
painting in Rome

14th-century Italian painters
Italian male painters
15th-century Italian painters
Painters from Florence
Italian Renaissance painters
Year of death unknown
Year of birth unknown